Gymnothorax indicus is a species of moray eel described as being brown and long. It's native to northern Bengal, India. The species has around 194 vertebrae.

Description 

The body is long thin and only gets gets thinner towards the end. Its upper jaw is marginally longer than its lower jaw. Its head is elongated with somewhat bigger eyes and its snout is dull.

References 

indicus
Fish described in 2016
Fish of India